This is a list of villages and smaller settlements in Cape Verde:

Boa Vista

 Bofarreira
 Cabeça dos Tarrafes
 Curral Velho - abandoned settlement
 Espingueira - abandoned settlement
 Estância de Baixo
 Fundo das Figueiras
 João Galego
 Povoação Velha
 Prazeres - abandoned settlement

Brava

 Cachaço
 Campo Baixo
 Cova Joana
 Cova Rodela
 Fajã de Água
 João da Noly
 Lem
 Mato
 Mato Grande
 Nossa Senhora do Monte
 Santa Bárbara
 Tantum
 Tomé Barraz
 Vinagre

Fogo

 Achada Furna
 Achada Grande
 Atalaia
 Cabeça Fundão
 Campanas Baixo
 Chã das Caldeiras
 Corvo
 Curral Grande
 Estância Roque
 Fajãzinha
 Feijoal
 Figueira Pavão
 Fonte Aleixo
 Galinheiro
 As Hortas
 Lagariça
 Lomba
 Miguel Gonçalves
 Monte Grande
 Patim
 Ponta Verde
 Relva
 Ribeira do Ilhéu
 Salto
 Santo António
 São Filipe
 São Jorge
 Tinteira
 Vicente Dias

Maio
 Alcatraz
 Barreiro
 Calheta
 Cascabulho
 Figueira da Horta
 Morrinho
 Morro
 Pedro Vaz
 Pilão Cão
 Praia Gonçalo
 Ribeira Dom João
 Santo Antônio

Sal
 Murdeira
 Palmeira
 Pedra de Lume
 Terra Boa

Santa Luzia
Santa Luzia - abandoned settlement

Santiago

 Achada Fazenda
 Achada Lem
 Achada Leitão
 Achada Monte
 Achada Tenda
 Água de Gato
 Banana
 Boa Entrada
 Calabaceira
 Cancelo
 Chão de Tanque
 Chaminé
 Covão Grande
 Espinho Branco
 Fazenda
 Figueira das Naus
 João Teves
 João Varela
 Levada dos Órgãos
 Milho Branco
 Montanha
 Palha Carga
 Picos (Achada Igreja)
 Porto Gouveia
 Porto Mosquito
 Praia Baixo
 Principal, also as Ribeira Principal
 Ribeira da Barca
 Ribeira da Prata
 Ribeirão Manuel
 Rincão
 Rui Vaz
 Saltos de Cima
 Santa Ana
 São Jorge dos Órgãos
 Trás os Montes
 Vale da Custa

Santo Antão
 Alto Mira
 Chã das Pedras
 Chã de Igreja
 Coculi
 Corda
 Eito
 Figueiras
 Fontainhas
 Garça de Cima
 Janela
 Lagoa
 Lajedo
 Lombo Branco
 Lombo de Santa
 Monte Trigo
 Morro Vento
 Pico da Cruz (Cinta das Vacas)
 Ribeira Alta
 Ribeira da Cruz
 Sinagoga
 Tarrafal de Monte Trigo
 Xoxo

São Nicolau
 Belém
 Cabeçalinho
 Cachaço
 Caleijão
 Carriçal
 Carvoeiros
 Covoada
 Estância de Brás
 Fajã de Baixo
 Fragata
 Hortelã
 Juncalinho
 Morro Brás
 Palhal
 Praia Branca
 Preguiça
 Queimadas
 Ribeira dos Calhaus
 Ribeira Funda

São Vicente
 Baía das Gatas
 Lameirão
 Lazareto Industrial (also as Industrial Lazareto)
 Ribeira de Calhau
 Ribeira de Vinha
 Salamansa
 São Pedro

See also 
List of cities and towns in Cabo Verde

 
Villages
Cape Verde